The men's +100 kg competition in judo at the 2016 Summer Olympics in Rio de Janeiro was held on 12 August at the Carioca Arena 2.

The gold and silver medals were determined by a single-elimination tournament, with the winner of the final taking gold and the loser receiving silver. Judo events awarded two bronze medals. Quarterfinal losers competed in a repechage match for the right to face a semifinal loser for a bronze medal (that is, the judokas defeated in quarterfinals A and B competed against each other, with the winner of that match facing the semifinal loser from the other half of the bracket).

The medals for the competition were presented by Rene Fasel, Switzerland, member of the International Olympic Committee and the gifts were presented by Jean-Luc Rouge, International Judo Federation secretary-general.

At the competition, in the first round Egyptian judoka Islam El Shahaby refused to shake the hand of Israeli judoka Or Sasson, the eventual bronze medalist, who had defeated El Shahaby. In August 2016 the Disciplinary Committee of the International Olympic Committee issued a "severe reprimand" to El Shehaby for behavior violating "the rules of fair play and against the spirit of friendship embodied in the Olympic Values", and requested that the Egyptian Olympic Committee in the future make certain that all Egyptian athletes are properly educated as to the Olympic Values before they participate in the Olympic Games.

Results

Finals

Repechages

Pool A

Pool B

Pool C

Pool D

References

External links
 

M101
Judo at the Summer Olympics Men's Heavyweight
Men's events at the 2016 Summer Olympics